Stade de Batié is a multi-use stadium in Batié, Cameroon.  It is used mostly for football matches. It is a home ground of Sable FC. The stadium holds 5,000 people.

References

Football venues in Cameroon